The 2008 ISSF World Cup Final in rifle and pistol events was held 3–5 November 2008 in Bangkok, Thailand, as the conclusion of the 2008 World Cup season. The final was held in Bangkok for the second consecutive time, and third overall.

There were twelve spots in each of the ten events. The defending champion from the 2007 World Cup Final and all medalists of the 2008 Olympics in Beijing qualified automatically for Bangkok. The remaining eight qualified through a special point-awarding system based on their best performance during the World Cup season, skipping past automatic qualifiers. Not counting the defending champion and the Olympic medalists, there was a maximum of two shooters per event from the same country.

The qualification system awarded a win with 15 points, a silver medal with 10, a bronze medal with 8, a fourth place with 5, a fifth with 4, a sixth with 3, a seventh with 2 and an eighth place with 1 point. It also gave out points for qualification scores within a certain range from the current world record: from 1 point for fourteen points off the record, to 15 points for equalling or raising it.

Schedule and winners 
All times are local (UTC+7).

Men's 50 metre rifle three positions

Qualification

Results 

DNS Did not start

Men's 50 metre rifle prone

Qualification 

Tamas did not participate and was replaced by Valérian Sauveplane.

Results

Men's 10 metre air rifle

Qualification 

Bindra did not participate.

Results 

EWR Equalled world record – WR World record

Men's 50 metre pistol

Qualification 

Tan did not participate.

Results

Men's 25 metre rapid fire pistol

Qualification 

Alifirenko, Pupo and Raicea did not participate and were replaced by Cha Sang-jun, Alexey Klimov and Taras Magmet.

Results

Men's 10 metre air pistol

Qualification

Results

Women's 50 metre rifle three positions

Qualification 

Emmons did not participate. In addition, Thanyalak Chotphibunsin entered as the host country's wild card.

Results

Women's 10 metre air rifle

Qualification 

Emmons and Lechner did not participate, and were replaced by Beate Gauss. In addition, Thanyalak Chotphibunsin entered as the host country's wild card.

Results 

EWR Equalled world record

Women's 25 metre pistol

Qualification 

Kolly did not participate. In addition, Tanyaporn Prucksakorn entered as the host country's wild card.

Results 

DNS Did not start

Women's 10 metre air pistol

Qualification 

Paderina, Kolly and Csonka did not participate and were replaced by Michela Suppo. In addition, Tanyaporn Prucksakorn entered as the host country's wild card.

Results

External links 
 Qualification standings at the ISSF website

ISSF World Cup
World Cup Final
Sport in Bangkok